The 2012 London Marathon was the 32nd running of the annual marathon race in London, England, which took place on Sunday, 22 April. Both of the elite races were won by Kenyan athletes, and Ethiopia's Tsegaye Kebede was the only non-Kenyan to reach the podium in either race. Mary Jepkosgei Keitany won the women's elite race for the second year running with a Kenyan record time of 2:18:37 hours. Wilson Kipsang Kiprotich was the men's race winner with a time of 2:04:44 – four seconds off Emmanuel Kipchirchir Mutai's course record set at the 2011 London Marathon. 

Around 170,150 people applied to enter the race: 50,200 had their applications accepted and 37,227 started the race. A total of 36,699, 23,634 men and 13,065 women, finished the race.

The top British finishers, Lee Merrien (17th) and Claire Hallissey (11th), earned the opportunity to compete for Great Britain at the 2012 Summer Olympics. The wheelchair races were won by two British athletes: David Weir took the men's title while Shelly Woods was the women's winner. 

A fun runner, Claire Squires, died after collapsing in the final mile of the race. In response to publicity of her death, the general public made donations to her fund raising page at the Justgiving website. Over 80,000 separate donations were made, raising a total of over £1 million for Samaritans.

A mini marathon was held for under-17 athletes over the last three miles of the course.  Michael Callegari (14:54) and Jessica Judd (her fourth straight title in 16:04) won the able-bodied races while Sheikh Sheikh (12:30) and Jade Jones (12:59) won the wheelchair races.

Results

Elite men

Two Moroccan runners from the men's race were retrospectively disqualified for doping: Abderrahime Bouramdane, who originally finished 11th in a time of 2:10:13, and Adil Annani, who was originally fourth in 2:07:43.

Elite women

Two athletes were subsequently disqualified for doping: Russia's Mariya Konovalova, who was originally 15th with a time of 2:30:29, and Ukraine's Yuliya Ruban, who originally placed 21st with 2:34:47.

Wheelchair men

Wheelchair women

References

Results
Virgin London Marathon 2012 Tracking and Results. London Marathon. Retrieved 2012-05-22.
2012 Race Report. London Marathon. Retrieved 2012-05-22.
Men Results. Association of Road Racing Statisticians. Retrieved 2020-04-26.
Women Results. Association of Road Racing Statisticians. Retrieved 2020-04-26.

External links

Official website

London Marathon
London Marathon
Marathon
April 2012 sports events in the United Kingdom